Levi Brown is the name of:
 Levi Brown (offensive tackle) (born 1984), American football offensive linesman
 Levi Brown (quarterback) (born 1987), American football quarterback

See also
 Nathaniel Levi Brown (born 1981), English professional footballer for Macclesfield Town